"Break 'Em Off" is a song by American rapper Paul Wall featuring fellow Houston-based rapper Lil' Keke. It was released on February 20, 2007 through Swishahouse/Atlantic Records as the lead single from Paul Wall's third solo studio album Get Money, Stay True. The production was handled by Leroy "Mr. Lee" Williams. The single debuted at number 72 on the US Billboard Hot 100 in early March 2007. The music video featured Jessica a.k.a. Miss Rabbit and Flavor of Love winner Chandra Davis a.k.a. Deelishis.

Track listing

Personnel
Paul Slayton – songwriter, rap vocals
Marcus Edwards – songwriter, rap vocals
Leroy Williams – songwriter, producer, recording, mixing

Charts

References

External links

2006 songs
2007 singles
Paul Wall songs
Lil' Keke songs
Atlantic Records singles
Songs written by Paul Wall